Sowrastan (also Romanized as Sowrastān) is a village in Bala Velayat Rural District, Bala Velayat District, Bakharz County, Razavi Khorasan Province, Iran. At the 2006 census, its population was 766, in 150 families.

References 

Populated places in Bakharz County